The eleventh season of the talent show The Voice of Germany premiered on October 7, 2021 on ProSieben and on October 10, 2021 on Sat.1. Both singers and songwriters Mark Forster and Nico Santos returned as coaches for their fifth and second seasons, respectively, and two new coaches joined: singers and songwriters Johannes Oerding, and Sarah Connor, who replaced Samu Haber & Rea Garvey, and Stefanie Kloss & Yvonne Catterfeld. Elif Demirezer was the new "Comeback Stage" coach, who selected contestants to participate in The Voice: Comeback Stage by SEAT, replacing Michael Schulte. Thore Schölermann and Lena Gercke returned as hosts for their tenth and seventh seasons, respectively.

Sebastian Krenz was named The Voice of Germany on December 19, 2021, this marked Johannes Oerding’s first and only win as a coach.

Coaches and hosts

On 9 June 2021, it was announced that Samu Haber, Rea Garvey, Stefanie Kloss, and Yvonne Catterfeld would not be returning for the eleventh season, and this season would not have a duo coach again. On 15 June 2021, it was rumored that Johannes Oerding and Sarah Connor would be joining the show as new coaches, whereas Mark Forster and Nico Santos would be returning. On 25 June 2021, ProSieben and Sat.1 announced that Forster, Santos, Oerding and Connor would be the coaches for the eleventh season, alongside Elif Demirezer who became this year's fifth coach, mentoring unsuccessful auditioners as well as eliminated artists from later rounds of the competition, on the online version The Voice: Comeback Stage by SEAT.

Thore Schölermann and Lena Gercke both remained on the show as hosts. Schölermann did not take part after the quarterfinal, because he and his wife are expecting the birth of their first child. Melissa Khalaj will moderate in his place in the semifinal and Steven Gätjen in the final.

Teams

Blind auditions
The blind auditions were recorded from June 25, 2021 to June 30, 2021 at Studio Adlershof in Berlin and were broadcast from October 7, 2021 until November 7, 2021, being broadcast every Thursday on ProSieben and every Sunday on Sat.1.

Battle rounds
The battle rounds were recorded from September 4, 2021 to September 5, 2021 in Berlin and will broadcast from November 11, 2021 until November 21, 2021, being broadcast like the blind auditions every Thursday on ProSieben and every Sunday on Sat.1. Sarah Connor participated in the recordings via video link after testing positive for the ‎‎coronavirus.

Unlike in previous seasons, each coach initially divided his participants into groups of three. Seven battles took place in Sarah Connor's 21-candidate group, and six battles each in the other three groups of 18 participants. After the rehearsals of each group of three, only two of the three candidates were usually admitted to the battle duels, the third was eliminated. The respective coach selected a participant of each battle directly into the next phase. ‎The defeated battle participants could be taken over by the other coaches via "Steal Deal". Each coach has only one steal throughout the battles, as opposed to two on the previous season. If more than one coach wanted to take on a candidate, the participant chose one of them as his new coach. Elif selected four more participants from all battles for the third phase of the Comeback Stage.

Sing-offs
The sing-off phase will be broadcast live on television; in all previous seasons it had been recorded. It will take place in two events on 25 and 28 November 2021 in Berlin. Each of the 28 remaining participants will perform a song. Two candidates from each coaching group are selected by audience voting, then the coach selects a third participant from his group for the Live shows. Elif selects a total of three further participants from all groups for the fourth round of the Comeback Stage. Anton Verzani, from Team Sarah, will not be participating in the live shows for personal reasons. On the afternoon of November 28, it was announced that Anouar Chauech from Sarah Connor's team would not be admitted to the Sing Offs because he had repeatedly violated values and rules.

Comeback stage 
This season's fifth coach, Elif Demirezer, selected artists who did not make a team during the blind auditions, as well as eliminated artists from later rounds of the competition, thus creating new rounds to The Voice: Comeback Stage by SEAT, exclusive to thevoiceofgermany.de. The two winners compete in the live shows against the talents of the main coaches (Forster, Santos, Connor, and Oerding), singing for a chance to win the eleventh season of The Voice of Germany.

First round 
During the first round of competition, the eight selected artists from Blind auditions went head to head, two artists per episode, and Demirezer selected a winner to move on to the next round.

Second round
In the second round, the four remaining artists chose another song to sing, with two of them advancing to the next round.

Third round
In the third round, Demirezer brought back four artists who were eliminated during the Battle rounds, giving them a chance to re-enter in the competition. These artists faced off against the two artists from the second round. At the end of the round, three of them, from any group, advances to the next round.

Final round
In the final round, the three winners of the third round competed against three eliminated artists from the Sing Offs. From these six artists, two advanced in the Semifinal.

Live shows
The live shows began airing on December 5, 2021 and ended on December 19, 2021 on Sat.1 and three live shows are planned in Berlin, after seasons 6 to 10 had only two live shows.

Week 1: Quarterfinal (December 5)
The first live show was aired on December 5, 2021, with three acts from each team performing. The public chose two artists from each team to advance to the semi-final.

Week 2: Semifinal (December 12)
The semi-final aired on December 12, 2021, with the eight advanced contestants of the quarter-finals and the two contestants of the Comeback Stage selected by Elif, participated. The public chose one artist from each team to advance to the final.

An initially planned guest appearance by the band Coldplay was canceled the day before the broadcast due to COVID-19 cases in the area around the band.

Week 3: Final (December 19)
The final aired on December 19, 2021. In the final week, the five finalists performed an original duet song with their coach and a duet with a special guest.

An initially planned guest appearance by Ed Sheeran was canceled shortly before the broadcast due to COVID-19 cases in his environment. Instead, he appeared in a video with a greeting message, singing an acoustic version of the new Christmas song Merry Christmas.

Elimination chart
Coaches color key

Results color key

Overall

Team

Ratings

Notes

References

External links
 Official website on ProSieben.de
 The Voice of Germany on fernsehserien.de

2021 German television seasons
11